She-Hulk (Jennifer Susan Walters) is a  character appearing in American comic books published by Marvel Comics. Created by writer Stan Lee and artist John Buscema, the character first appeared in The Savage She-Hulk #1 (November 1979). Walters is a lawyer who, after an injury, received an emergency blood transfusion from her cousin, Bruce Banner, and acquired a milder version of his Hulk condition. As such, Walters becomes a large, powerful, green-hued version of herself. Unlike Banner she largely retains her personality, in particular the majority of her intelligence and emotional control. Like Hulk, she is still susceptible to outbursts of anger and becomes much stronger when enraged. In later series, her transformation is permanent, and she often breaks the fourth wall for humorous effect and running gags.

She-Hulk has been a member of the Avengers, the Fantastic Four, Heroes for Hire, the Defenders, Fantastic Force and S.H.I.E.L.D. As a highly skilled lawyer who became a superhero by accident, she frequently leverages her legal and personal experience to serve as legal counsel to various superheroes and other metahumans.

She-Hulk has been described as one of Marvel's most notable and powerful female heroes.

Walters made her live-action debut in the Marvel Cinematic Universe (MCU) with the Disney+ original series She-Hulk: Attorney at Law (2022), portrayed by Tatiana Maslany.

Publication history

She-Hulk was created by Stan Lee, who wrote only the first issue, and was the last character he created for Marvel Comics, until his return to comics with Ravage 2099 in 1992. The reason behind the character's creation had to do with the success of The Incredible Hulk (1977–1982) and The Bionic Woman television series, both from Universal Television. Marvel was afraid that the show's executives might suddenly introduce a female version of the Hulk, as producer Kenneth Johnson had already done with The Six Million Dollar Man. So Marvel decided to publish their own version of such a character to make sure that if a similar one showed up in the television series, Marvel would own the rights. Kenneth Johnson later said the plans for season five of The Incredible Hulk was to have Banner's sister suffering from a disease where only the blood of a sibling could save her life, which would turn her into a "woman Hulk who was crazy and scary and dangerous". But six episodes into the season, a new boss at CBS decided to cancel the show with immediate effect, ending the last season with episode seven.

All but the first issue of The Savage She-Hulk were written by David Anthony Kraft and penciled by Mike Vosburg, and most issues were inked by Frank Springer. Vosburg later remarked, "The oddest thing about that book was that Frank drew really beautiful women, I drew really beautiful women, and yet, the She-Hulk was never overly attractive." The Savage She-Hulk series lasted until 1982, where it ended with #25 (March 1982). She-Hulk then made guest appearances in other characters' books. Her earliest guest-starring adventures followed no specific story line, besides her recurring bad luck with automobiles. She-Hulk also appeared in the limited series, Marvel Super Hero Contest of Champions (June to August 1982), in which numerous superheroes are kidnapped from Earth to fight in space.

She-Hulk becomes a member of the Avengers in Avengers #221 (July 1982). Her early Avengers appearances continued the running gag about her car troubles. She-Hulk also made occasional guest appearances in The Incredible Hulk. Her appearance in The Avengers #233 (July 1983) was drawn by John Byrne, who would later become strongly associated with the character. 

At the conclusion of the first Secret Wars miniseries, She-Hulk joins the Fantastic Four (Fantastic Four #265 (April 1984)). During She-Hulk's tenure with the Fantastic Four, she appeared in Marvel Graphic Novel #16: The Aladdin Effect, Marvel Graphic Novel No. 17: Revenge of the Living Monolith, and Marvel Graphic Novel #18: The Sensational She-Hulk. All three graphic novels appeared in 1985. The last, #18, appearing in November 1985, was written and illustrated by then-Fantastic Four writer/artist John Byrne.

She-Hulk regained a solo series in 1989, The Sensational She-Hulk (maintaining the 1985 graphic novel's title). The Sensational She-Hulk ran for 60 issues. Issues #1–8, 31–46, and 48–50 were written and drawn by Byrne. Byrne's She-Hulk stories satirized comic books and introduced She-Hulk's awareness that she is a comic book character. Two issues tested the limits of the Comics Code: #34 makes reference to the 1991 Vanity Fair cover in which actress Demi Moore appeared nude and pregnant (She-Hulk's version has her holding a green beach ball to imitate Moore's pregnancy). In issue #40, She-Hulk is depicted jumping rope (apparently) in the nude, with her breasts and genital area covered by blur lines; the cover of the same issue shows her covering herself with a form sporting the lines "Approved [...] Comics Code". Other writers to contribute to this series include Steve Gerber (#10, 11 and 13–23), Simon Furman, and Peter David.

During The Sensational She-Hulk, the character continued making numerous guest appearances. In 1990, She-Hulk appeared in the two-issue limited series She-Hulk: Ceremony, adapted from a Dwayne McDuffie pitch for a cancelled She-Hulk romantic comedy ongoing series.

The Sensational She-Hulk ran until issue #60 (February 1994), making it the longest-running solo title of any Marvel superheroine up to that point. After the cancellation of She-Hulk's second solo series, she continued making backup, one-shot, and team appearances in Fantastic Force (starting with issue #13 in November 1995), the 1996 miniseries Doc Samson #1–4 (January–April 1996), Heroes for Hire #8–19 (February 1998 through the series finale in January 1999), and The Avengers. Her next major appearance was in the May 2002 one-shot titled Thing and She-Hulk: The Long Night.

In May 2004, She-Hulk was given a new title and launched in a wave of six new Marvel books. Despite favorable critical notices, the new series could not escape the low sales numbers that the titles received from their initial cluster-style launch. Marvel brought the series to a close with #12 and promised a re-launch of the title (as a "second season") eight months later. The eight-month gap is alluded to in the body of the story itself.

With the original creative team (Dan Slott and Juan Bobillo) from the previous series, the book returned eight months later as promised in October 2005. The third issue was billed as the 100th issue of a She-Hulk comic book, and had story art by numerous artists, including Vosburg. There was no new artwork by Buscema or Byrne, who were represented by reprints of The Sensational She-Hulk #1 and The Savage She-Hulk #1.

Dan Slott's last issue is #21; with 33 issues, Slott has written the most solo issues of She-Hulk. Peter David became the new writer with She-Hulk #22. Marvel Comics announced that She-Hulk #38 (February 2009) would be the final issue of the series. Peter David commented on his blog that sales of the book were hurt due to discrepancies between his book and Jeph Loeb's Hulk series, caused by editorial error:

The mantle of She-Hulk is challenged by Lyra, the daughter of Hulk and Thundra, who is the lead character in All-New Savage She-Hulk, a miniseries written by Fred Van Lente.

She-Hulk appeared in FF by Matt Fraction and Mike Allred, which debuted in November 2012.

An ongoing She-Hulk series, written by Charles Soule and drawn by Javier Pulido, debuted in 2014. It was revealed in October 2014 that Soule and Pulido's run of She-Hulk, which had the character facing off against Matt Murdock in court, would end with issue 12.

Since May 2015, She-Hulk has appeared as one of the main characters in A-Force, an all-female Avengers spin-off being launched by G. Willow Wilson, Marguerite Bennett, and Jorge Molina during Marvel's Secret Wars crossover.

She-Hulk starred in the comic titled Hulk beginning December 2016. The series showed how she dealt with the trauma stemming from her cousin's death, and the injuries sustained at the hands of Thanos, as fallout from the Civil War II event. She appeared colored grey, similar to Hulk's "Joe Fixit" persona, and there were great differences in tone from her previous lighthearted adventures. The title was cancelled with issue #163 in March 2018.

In 2022, She-Hulk returned as an ongoing series by writer Rainbow Rowell and artist Rogê Antônio.  The series returns to the lighthearted tone of the previous comics and focuses on She-Hulk's return to practicing law.

Fictional character biography

The Savage She-Hulk

Jennifer Walters, the cousin of Bruce Banner (Hulk), is the small and somewhat shy daughter of Los Angeles County Sheriff William Morris Walters and Elaine (née Banner) Walters (who died in a car crash when Jennifer was 17). Operatives of Nicholas Trask, a crime boss who had crossed paths with her father, shot and seriously wounded her on the day that Banner visited her to tell her about his transformation into the Hulk. Since no other donors with her blood type were available, Banner provided his blood for a transfusion; as they already shared the same blood type and DNA, his gamma-irradiated blood, combined with her anger, transformed Jennifer into the green-skinned She-Hulk when the mobsters tried to finish her off at the hospital. She then used her new powers to take down Trask, who was killed when the earth-boring device he rode malfunctioned, taking him to the center of the Earth.

As She-Hulk, Jennifer possessed powers similar to those of her cousin, though at a reduced level. She also possessed a less monstrous, more Amazonian appearance. Initially, anger triggered the transformation to her She-Hulk form (as with Bruce Banner's). Like her cousin Bruce, his counterpart, the Leader, Doc Samson and most other persons mutated by exposure to gamma radiation over the years, her mutated form was originally explained as being molded by her subconscious desire to look like the ideal woman. She eventually gains control of her transformations when Michael Morbius cures her of a lethal blood disease. As a criminal defense lawyer, she defended Morbius in his trial for his vampiric killings and managed to reduce the conviction to involuntary manslaughter, considering his medical condition.

Eventually, Jennifer decides that she will retain her She-Hulk form permanently—preferring the freedom, confidence, and assertiveness it gave her compared to her more timorous and fragile "normal" form. After her brief solo career, she joined the Avengers. This led to her being transported to Battleworld by the Beyonder and her participation in the Secret Wars, is most notable for sparking her long-standing rivalry with the newly empowered Titania. After the heroes returned to Earth, she temporarily replaced the Thing (who, having been repeatedly de-powered during the event, opted to stay in Battleworld for some time as a form of soul-searching) as a member of the Fantastic Four.

During her tenure with the Fantastic Four, She-Hulk met and started a romance with Wyatt Wingfoot. One day, she had to prevent a radiation leak in a downed S.H.I.E.L.D. Helicarrier. This radiation exposure drastically affected Jennifer: she could no longer transform back into her original human form. However, this was an agreeable turn of events for her, since she preferred being She-Hulk, and it was revealed much later by Leonard Samson and Reed Richards that the block was purely psychological.

Shortly after that, she appeared before the Supreme Court, where she battled Titania again.

The Sensational She-Hulk
After her Fantastic Four years, She-Hulk rejoined the Avengers for a while. She became hypnotized by the Ringmaster into becoming a performer in the Circus of Crime, and battled the Headmen. With Spider-Man, she defeated the Headmen and became an assistant District Attorney and began working for New York City district attorney Blake Tower. Here she met Louise "Weezie" Grant Mason, formerly the Golden Age superheroine the Blonde Phantom. She had a long series of unusual encounters, including when she battled Doctor Bong, first contended against Xemnu the Living Titan, encountered "Nick St. Christopher", and encountered "Spragg the Living Hill/Comet".

The Sensational She-Hulk #15 introduced a grey version of She-Hulk that appeared at night only and shared a lot in common with the Hulk, such as having a childlike mind, speaking in the third person and divorcing from her Jennifer Walters identity, referring to Jennifer as "puny Jennifer", She-Hulk returned to normal in the following issue, with her green coloration returning in The Sensational She-Hulk #17. She-Hulk later discovered that Louise Mason had manipulated Tower into hiring her, so that Mason might again star in a comic book (and thus avoid dying of old age). Later, while doing legal work for Heroes for Hire, She-Hulk spent some time dating Luke Cage.

After a time, She-Hulk returns to the Avengers. Repeated exposure to the presence of her teammate Jack of Hearts, who has the innate ability to absorb radiation that is around him, leads to She-Hulk being unable to control her changes, which resulted in her tearing the Vision in half. It is then revealed that all of the events were caused by the Scarlet Witch. Now, when she is afraid, she not only turns into She-Hulk but her mind becomes maddened by paranoia and rage. Jennifer flees, fearing that she will endanger her friends and others, leading to the "Search for She-Hulk" storyline.

The other Avengers track her to the town of Bone, Idaho, where Jennifer is lying low but the anxiety of being found prompts her to change, causing her to damage much of the town. Her cousin shows up but fails to reason with her; he "Hulks out" and the two fight—the devastation to the town subsequently being blamed on the Hulk.

Psychological limitations inhibit her transformation between her two forms. For a time, as detailed in "She-Hulk" #4 (March 2006), Jennifer works as a relief volunteer helping to repair Bone. She gains confidence after solving a murder mystery, reveals her green alter-ego to the entire town, and then uses her strength to make many more repairs. This, combined with Leonard Samson's new 'gamma-charger', gives her full control over her transformations for, as she said, 'the time being'.

JLA/Avengers
In the DC/Marvel crossover JLA/Avengers, She-Hulk first appears being brainwashed by Starro when the Avengers battle her, grabbing a startled Ms. Marvel (Carol Danvers) by her leg, before the latter blasts her away with her powers. She later assists the Avengers in the subsequent hunt for the 12 artifacts needed to trap the DC villain Krona, first battling Aquaman in Asgard, and later in the Savage Land with the rest of the heroes. During the final battle against Krona and his forces, she assists Wonder Woman in her battle against Surtur, and eventually appears at the end as one of the heroes that started out the entire event.

Single Green Female
The events of The Search for She-Hulk, combined with her own lack of personal responsibility and the potential legal ramifications of her saving the world swaying juries leads Jennifer back to the legal profession in a more full-time capacity, when she was asked to practice law in the Superhuman Law division of the New York firm of Goodman, Lieber, Kurtzberg & Holliway (GLK&H). This offer is dependent upon Jennifer remaining human while she worked for the firm.

While practicing at GLK&H, Jennifer gradually becomes comfortable as both She-Hulk and Jennifer Walters, realizing that she has much to offer the world in both forms. During one of these adventures, she realizes her strength as She-Hulk is dependent on her strength as Walters and works out in her human form. Thus, she exponentially increases her powers as She-Hulk.

Civil War
She-Hulk registered under the Superhuman Registration Act, and is a supporter of Tony Stark (Iron Man). However, as an attorney, she advised individuals on both sides of the Civil War. She agreed to file suit against Peter Parker for fraud on behalf of her father-in-law, Daily Bugle publisher J. Jonah Jameson. Her intention is to keep the suit tied up in the courts indefinitely. She is also the lawyer for Speedball in Civil War: Front Line.

In She-Hulk #14 (2006), Clay Quartermain of S.H.I.E.L.D. informs Jennifer that she has been drafted into the organization as a result of her registration. Her mission is to fight various foes of the Hulk while training heroes under the Initiative. She serves with the Hulkbusters: Clay Quartermain, Agent Crimson, Agent Cheesecake and Agent Beefcake.

World War Hulk
Due to her involvement in S.H.I.E.L.D., She-Hulk derives a bit of information suggesting that the organization knows of her cousin's whereabouts. Anticipating a problem, Tony Stark has She-Hulk secretly injected with S.P.I.N. Tech that transforms her to human form. Enraged, she tells Stark that, although he may have taken She-Hulk out of the equation, he still has to face Jennifer Walters, one of the best lawyers in the country. Jennifer informs Stark that he's miscalculated: She-Hulk would have just pummeled him, but Jennifer Walters has the ability to destroy him.

On her way home, Jennifer runs into Amadeus Cho, a young genius out looking for friends of the Hulk. Cho, whom the Hulk once saved, discovered what the Illuminati had done to the Hulk, and he wants help in finding him. Cho temporarily restores Jennifer's powers so that she can take out Doc Samson, who came to apprehend Cho for Reed Richards and Tony Stark. Cho says he can permanently restore Jennifer's powers if she will join him, but she politely refuses, instead directing him to Hercules and Angel.

During the "World War Hulk" storyline, a re-powered She-Hulk assists in the evacuation of Manhattan. She tries to reason with her cousin, who has just destroyed Stark Tower during his battle with Iron Man. The Hulk warns her to leave, but she stands her ground. After she lands a punch squarely to his face, the Hulk smashes her into the ground, creating a crater around her body. As he moves on to his next confrontation, all Jennifer can say is: "God help us all."

Jennifer is held captive with the other defeated heroes at Madison Square Garden, which the Hulk has converted into a gladiatorial arena. The heroes have been implanted with the same obedience discs that compelled the Hulk and his allies to fight one another during their time on the planet Sakaar.

Jennifer returns to the law firm to work on suing Tony Stark for stealing her powers. She is subpoenaed to give a testimony in a case in which Mallory Book is trying to prove that the Leader's criminal acts are the result of a shift of personality induced by his mutation, and an addiction to his gamma irradiated powers, and that he thus cannot be held accountable for his actions. During her testimony, Jennifer realizes that she herself is "addicted" to being She-Hulk; Mallory forces her to admit that she has had a long list of sexual partners as She-Hulk. After the testimony, Pug appears and the two spend an evening together as friends, which cheers her up. She confronts Mallory the next day and tells her that she will put a stop to her Leader case. However, it is revealed that the Leader has been acquitted of his crimes.

There is an apparent inconsistency between the She-Hulk and World War Hulk comics: in She-Hulk #19, the Leader is on trial in New York City, which is being cleaned up after the Hulk's recent attack. The action in the issue takes place during or after the events of World War Hulk. However, Jennifer appears as She-Hulk in the first and second issues of World War Hulk, during which the Hulk is destroying New York City. The discrepancy is resolved in She-Hulk #20: Jennifer explains that Tony Stark temporarily disabled the nanobots to allow her to assist in the battle against her cousin, only to reactivate them when the battle was over. She amends her suit against Stark to demand the permanent deactivation of the nanobots.

Post-World War Hulk
At some point after World War Hulk, Jennifer was brought before the Living Tribunal, and asked to weigh her universe against a newer, better "cosmic trophy wife" version, described by Walters as "an ultimate universe." Her universe wins, and she resigns from the Magistrati.

After the Leader's trial, Artie Zix reveals himself as RT-Z9 and holds the main staff of GLK&H hostage while asking them questions at the behest of a group of aliens from a corner of the galaxy recently discovered by the Watcher Qyre. The aliens, called the Recluses, wish to keep their existence a secret. She-Hulk earlier decreed that Qyre not reveal knowledge of the Recluses' existence at the meetings of the Watchers. This had serious repercussions: it is revealed at the close of She-Hulk #20 that an evil being has conquered that portion of the galaxy, and is preparing an assault on all of creation. Qyre, who holds knowledge of the plan, is unable to speak of it to anyone else. At She-Hulk's time trial, it was revealed that her actions made a destructive event called the Reckoning War possible. However, comments made by the future Southpaw, divulge that the war, though a terrible and dark time, will be favorably resolved.

A permanently de-powered Jennifer Walters finds that tourists from an alternate universe – designated the Alpha universe – are crossing into her universe – which they call Beta – to gain access to superpowers and comes face to face with her own powered-up doppelganger. Jennifer confirms that her Alpha counterpart slept with the Juggernaut but her anger quickly turns to sorrow as she realizes that without her abilities, the Alpha Jennifer Walters – while unfamiliar with superhuman law – is far better suited to life in the Beta universe. Realizing this, she decides that she will go to the Alpha universe and let the other Jennifer Walters take over for her.

As she steps through the portal, Reed Richards realizes he can use the previously stored configuration of the Alpha She-Hulk to restore Jennifer's powers by purging the nanites from her body and setting the teleporter to loop her back to this reality. Having regained her abilities, Jennifer remains in her home reality, while the Alpha Jen Walters returns to her own universe and reconciles with her boyfriend, the Alpha Augustus "Pug" Pugliese.

At an unspecified time after World War Hulk, She-Hulk assists Tony Stark with Emil Blonsky's murder investigation. While in Stark's Helicarrier, she is attacked and beaten by the Red Hulk who states to her that he's not Bruce. She-Hulk vows to get even for the deliberate humiliation. She later helps to prevent casualties in San Francisco after the Red Hulk caused an earthquake in the area, and assembles Thundra and the Valkyrie together to capture him.

Some months after regaining her abilities, Jennifer was tasked to defend an accused killer named Arthur Moore. While she was successful in defending him, immediately after his freedom was secured he claimed to be guilty and showed her images of the crimes he had been accused of. Jennifer's horror at what she was being shown, combined with Moore's gloating, was enough to push her rage so far that she became the savage She-Hulk once again. She attacked him and threatened to kill him if he was not given the death penalty. She also told everybody within earshot that he was guilty and backed up her accusation by revealing privileged information. This resulted in her being disbarred. Jennifer later found out that Moore really was innocent; the images he had shown her had been false. It was also revealed, albeit not to Jennifer, that Moore had hoped to get her to react exactly the way she did since his employers wanted She-Hulk disbarred for purposes as yet unknown. Unable to practice law any more, Jennifer began working for Freeman Bonds Inc. – a subsidiary of GLK&B – as a bounty hunter with her Skrull partner Jazinda.

She was later recruited by Stark as a member of an Initiative-sponsored incarnation of the Defenders for a short while until Tony Stark disbanded the team. Afterwards, she continued to aid team leader Nighthawk for a brief time until she was fully able to join the team on Nighthawk's request and that it would be away from the Initiative.

Together they have several adventures, even encountering Hercules, but they soon ended up involved in the midst of the Secret Invasion.

Secret Invasion
During the Skrull takeover of Earth during Secret Invasion, She-Hulk and Jazinda hunt down a member of the Skrulls who functions as their religious leader. X-Factor initially impedes her progress, but they part ways on uncertain terms. She-Hulk and Jazinda capture the Skrull and the two heroines take the Skrull to New York, where they encounter the Super-Skrull, Kl'rt. Kl'rt came to kill his daughter, Jazinda, going so far as to shoot her in the head. Due to her regenerative properties, Jazinda was still not fully dead. The Skrull religious leader wants to completely remove her regenerative ability, but Kl'rt stops him after She-Hulk pleads to his fatherly nature, tapping into his guilt for not being able to save his son who had died in a previous war.

Lady Liberators
Some time after the Skrull invasion is defeated, the country of Marinmer suffers a devastating earthquake. Because the victims of the earthquake are members of a minority religious group, the Marinmer government has confiscated all humanitarian aid packages, and because of Marinmer's strong ties to powerful countries such as Russia and China, other nations refuse to intervene for fear of sparking a war. She-Hulk and several members of the Lady Liberators secretly enter Marinmer, intending to steal the confiscated aid packages and distribute them to the earthquake victims. The Winter Guard attempts to stop them, but gives up after seeing the plight of the earthquake victims. Afterwards, the US government attempts to arrest She-Hulk for her actions in Marinmer, but drops the charges to avoid political embarrassment. With public opinion overwhelmingly in her favor, She-Hulk seems poised to get her legal license back when Jazinda is captured by the Behemoth after he mistakenly attacks her, thinking she is the real She-Hulk. Jazinda is then taken to a government lab and brutally experimented on when her ability to resurrect herself from the dead is discovered. Jazinda contacts She-Hulk telepathically through a secretly implanted mind reading device and warns her that the government will be coming to question her about their relationship. Jazinda tells She-Hulk to say she did not know Jazinda was a Skrull and just before going dead/unconscious tells She-Hulk "I've always l...". She-Hulk tries to keep up the denial, but when she sees Jazinda about to be vivisected, she loses control and breaks Jazinda out. The Behemoth tries to stop her, but She-Hulk defeats him with the help of the Lady Liberators. Later it is revealed that Mallory Book, her former boss, was behind all the bad things happening to She-Hulk along with a group called the "Fourth Wall". Yet when she saw She-Hulk risk herself to save her Skrull friend, Book "cancelled" the plan.

Dark Reign
In the four-issue miniseries All-New Savage She-Hulk, Jennifer fights Lyra, the alternate reality daughter of Hulk and Thundra after she comes to the Earth-616 reality for the DNA of the strongest man. While Jennifer and Lyra were fighting, Sentry tosses her away believing the man Lyra is referring to is him. She-Hulk later returns, enraged, and pummels the Sentry into the ground. She then helps Lyra escape from Avengers Tower.

M.I.A.
In Incredible Hulk #600, Jennifer tasks Ben Urich to discover the identity of Red Hulk. She informs him that she is unable to as she has asked too many questions to the wrong people. She has Urich bring a photographer (Peter Parker), and meets him along with her insider, Doc Samson, and they venture into a S.H.I.E.L.D. base that is actually a front for A.I.M. and General Ross's Gamma Power Super Soldier Program. Leonard Samson then appears to have a breakdown, but in reality he is changing into Samson. Samson claims to be stronger and faster (and is larger in size, has longer hair and a lightning bolt scar) than Jennifer. The clashing duo are subdued by MODOK and the facility explodes in the aftermath of a fight between Red Hulk and Hulk; Jennifer, Samson (who has reverted to Leonard) and Red Hulk are caught in the explosion. Jennifer's status is unknown and Red Hulk does not reveal anything to Urich when the two meet a second time.

While She-Hulk is M.I.A., the Red She-Hulk makes her first appearance where she claims Jennifer Walters to be dead.

It was later shown in a flashback that Red She-Hulk prevented Jennifer Walters from escaping from A.I.M. custody. During this battle, Red She-Hulk brutally beat Jennifer and snapped her neck with a cable. In the last panel, Jennifer Walters appeared to be dead with the Red She-Hulk standing over her body, though the Red She-Hulk claims she did not know her own strength. She then questions Doc Samson whether it was the real She-Hulk or a Life-Model Decoy, to which Samson answers "You're here to follow orders, not to ask questions". Lyra later infiltrates the Intelligencia, where she finds Jennifer in stasis. Following a brief fight with the Red She-Hulk, the three decide to team up to take down Intelligencia's forces.

Incredible Hulks
Following the defeat of the Intelligencia, Jennifer begins traveling with her cousin Bruce, Skaar, Korg, Rick Jones and Betty Ross. Shortly after the events of World War Hulks, Skaar becomes aware that his brother Hiro-Kala is approaching and that he intends to crash the planet K'ai into the Earth. She-Hulk is on the team as they manage to successfully avert disaster. Upon returning to Earth, they find the world in flames as it is in the grasp of the Chaos War. They journey to Hell, where they fight and defeat the Chaos King. Returning to a restored Earth, they are greeted as monsters.

At some point before or after these events, Jennifer and Lyra settle in New York, where Lyra begins to attend high school in an attempt to gain an understanding of humanity as it occurs in this timeline. As well as helping to integrate Lyra into society, they are also involved in trying to round up the remaining members of the Intelligencia.

They manage to round up the Intelligencia, but the Wizard is able to escape imprisonment and goes after Lyra at her high school prom, almost killing her before She-Hulk intervenes, knocking out Wizard but not before Lyra's secret identity has been compromised. The rest of the pupils turn on Lyra as a result of her prom date being injured and the endangerment of everyone at the dance. She-Hulk explains to her afterwards that they have to leave and that despite being heroes, the life of a Hulk is often lonely.

Fearsome Four
During the Fear Itself storyline, She-Hulk joins with Howard the Duck, Nighthawk and the Frankenstein Monster to form a four-person team called the Fearsome Four to stop the Man-Thing from its destructive path. They later discover a plot by Psycho-Man to use the Man-Thing's volatile empathy to create a weapon.

Future Foundation
Prior to a time- and multiverse-spanning trip by the Fantastic Four and family, the Thing asks She-Hulk to be a member of the Future Foundation.

Doc Green
When the Hulk is elevated into "Doc Green" – a version of the Hulk possessing Bruce Banner's intellect – after he is treated for a shot to the head as Bruce Banner by use of the Extremis virus, he sets out to attack and cure other gamma-based mutations. Steve Rogers attempts to order the Hulk to stop before he goes after She-Hulk, but when Doc Green finally confronts her, he instead admits that he has come to recognize that he is coming dangerously close to the Maestro, as part of him enjoyed eliminating his 'rivals', having decided instead to accept the eventual loss of his intellect as Extremis wore off rather than risk that persona emerging. Informing She-Hulk that she is the only gamma mutation whose life he felt had been legitimately enhanced by her condition, Doc Green provides her with the last injection of his cure, asking her to use it on him if he goes too far in his efforts to stop an A.I. version of himself that he created and unleashed.

Gwenpool
In Gwenpool's first Christmas special, Howard the Duck invited her to She-Hulk's Christmas party on the provision that she has not killed any good guys recently. She shows up and karaokes with Ms. Marvel. Also there was a one-shot image of her holding mistletoe over her head and inviting She-Hulk to kiss her while Ms. Marvel looked on in girlish glee. There were dozens of superhumans in attendance, proving that whether she is acting as a hero or not, She-Hulk keeps strong ties to the super-community.

Civil War II
During the 2016 Civil War II storyline, after the Inhuman Ulysses predicts Thanos' arrival on Earth, She-Hulk was mortally wounded by a direct attack from the villain in question. When Iron Man learns that they used Ulysses' precognitive power to ambush Thanos, he vows to make sure that no one uses it again. Before She-Hulk goes into cardiac arrest, she tells Captain Marvel to fight for the future. After Hawkeye was acquitted for shooting Bruce Banner, Captain Marvel visited She-Hulk, who came out of her coma. When She-Hulk angrily demanded to know the verdict of Hawkeye's trial, Captain Marvel remained silent.

Post-Civil War II
Following Bruce Banner's funeral, Jennifer Walters left the superhero business and continued to work as a lawyer, where she gained her first client: Maise Brewn, who was an Inhuman descendant. Due to the stress following the fight with Thanos, Jennifer started turning uncontrollably into her version of the Grey Hulk at different intervals. Jennifer helped Maise when she was recovering from the trauma and being evicted by her landlord Mr. Tick. When Maise got impatient with Jennifer and summoned a Fear Golem that killed Mr. Tick and some police officers, Jennifer is nearly killed by it and transforms into the Hulk. She defeated the Fear Golem and prevented Maise from committing suicide when Maise was arrested for reckless endangerment afterwards.

Afterwards, Jennifer transformed into the Hulk and met the Hellcat. After changing back, Jennifer told the Hellcat that she was worried over the fact that her grey color could mean that she is like Bruce (since Bruce also had a grey incarnation). Later, Jennifer was watching a live video on the internet when a baker named Oliver turned into a Hulk-like creature on-camera. Jennifer spent several days trying to track him down, eventually confronting him as the Hulk at the Brooklyn Bridge. During the following battle, she lost control of her Hulk persona, almost killing him, though the Hellcat managed to calm her down. However, the incident left Jennifer worried about losing control again.

Some time later, the Leader kidnapped Jennifer and forced her to transform into the Hulk in order to force her to kill his new assistant, Robyn, who willingly went through a blood transfusion in order to become a Hulk-like monster herself. The Hulk nearly killed Robyn, but Jennifer managed to regain control, before defeating the Leader by electrocuting him. Jen then went with self-help writer Florida Mayer, who used a special pill to transport Jennifer to her subconscious, leading her to confront her Hulk persona and illusions of Thanos and Banner, finally overcoming her trauma in the process. Upon waking, Jennifer reverted to her standard green She-Hulk persona.

During the war against the Cotati, She-Hulk is revealed to have been killed and replaced by a Cotati, attacking the Avengers when they tried to negotiate a truce with their new enemy, the heroes only surviving the attack thanks to the Invisible Woman's forcefield, although the Cotati/She-Hulk then beats down the Thing and retreats. Invisible Woman, Mantis, and Thing are locked in combat with the Cotati-possessed She-Hulk. Back in New York, Jo-Venn and N'kalla release their positive memories which revives She-Hulk enough to break the Cotati off of her and to stop the fighting between the Kree and the Skrull. When the Cotati are defeated, She-Hulk and Thor take Sequoia away. It turns out that She-Hulk was able to return to life thanks to Leader who has mastered the way to control the Green Door.

Characterization

Powers and abilities
A transfusion of gamma-irradiated blood from her cousin Bruce Banner (the Hulk) granted Jennifer Walters superhuman powers. In her She-Hulk form, she possesses enormous superhuman strength, that potentially makes her the physically strongest known woman in the Marvel Universe when her emotional state is sufficiently high.

Although She-Hulk's strength originally remained at a set level and did not increase, later in her history her strength has sporadically been stated to increase further from fear, or anger, similarly to her cousin. In addition the character possesses superhuman speed, agility, stamina, and reflexes.

As She-Hulk, Walters is exponentially stronger than she is in her Jennifer Walters form; therefore any extra strength gained as Jennifer Walters through intense physical training will be amplified, making her She-Hulk form even stronger. After being defeated by the Champion of the Universe, She-Hulk exercised for several months in her Jennifer Walters form, resulting in a significant gain in strength and muscular mass in her She-Hulk form and allowing her to soundly defeat the Champion in a rematch. At this time she was able to effortlessly sustain the Thing's maximum weight with a single arm, while her strength was greatly restrained by a "Jupiter suit," and she was shown as considerably stronger than Hercules. Similarly to her cousin, her powers can also greatly increase by absorbing radiation. She is capable of absorbing great amounts of energy, and used this ability to absorb the uncontrolled energy of the new Starbrand.

She-Hulk received a power upgrade from Eson, the Celestial, and became more powerful than ever before, far surpassing Captain Marvel and other characters in strength. A Cotati-possessed She-Hulk nearly killed the Thing with her bare hands and punched through the Invisible Woman's force field without even noticing Susan Richards's efforts to protect her teammate.

She-Hulk's body is superhumanly durable and nearly impervious to force, pain, and disease: her skin can withstand extremes of temperature, as well as tremendous stresses and impacts without puncture wounds or lacerations. Her enhanced physiology renders her immune to all terrestrial diseases. She-Hulk also possesses a healing factor, which enabled her to completely recover, within minutes, from a skewering by the Wendigo.

Due to training from the alien Ovoids, She-Hulk is able to swap powers and physiques with other human women, but retains her green skin pigmentation, and only used it once.

Due to the Hulk's wish, Jennifer can now switch between her human and Hulk forms at will.

For a time, thanks to a hex cast by the Scarlet Witch, anyone who wished She-Hulk harm could not recognize her as Jennifer, but harmful side effects forced Jennifer to seek the assistance of Doctor Strange to remove the hex.

She-Hulk is described as a living gamma bomb and is capable of accidentally causing huge explosions, "beyond what even Hulk can produce". She described herself as an Omega level threat, and claimed that the Starbrand is "one of Earth's inherent defense systems – sorta like me". After apparently being killed by a mysterious magical ritual, a Cotati-possessed She-Hulk blasted the Thing nearly unconscious. The shockwave from the same blast sent the Invisible Woman and Mantis flying, even though both of them were protected by Sue's force field. The strain made Sue's nose bleed.

She still maintains mental contact with Eson, the Celestial.

Skills
She-Hulk is a formidable hand-to-hand combatant, having been trained by Captain America and Gamora. Even in her Jennifer Walters form, she possesses sufficient skill in the martial arts to dispatch several would-be muggers much larger than she is. She once displayed sufficient knowledge of acupressure to render the Abomination insensate by striking several nerve clusters after first using psychology to distract him.

She-Hulk is also a skilled and experienced attorney who attended the UCLA School of Law, where she was a member of the Order of the Coif, a national merit society for top legal scholars. She-Hulk had performed legal work as a member of the Magistrati, who had the power to compel her to adjudicate cases anywhere in creation. She ceased to operate in this function after successfully adjudicating the merits of her own universe to continue existing (opposed by the Ultimate Marvel Universe) before the Living Tribunal.

She is a skilled pilot and has previously used a modified 1995 Dodge automobile equipped with technology enabling flight in Earth's atmosphere and in outer space for limited distances, although it is incapable of interstellar flight.

Personality
The character's personality has changed over the decades since her first appearance: originally ill-tempered and violent, she is now depicted as a fun-loving, kind, empathetic, yet still feisty woman who frequently uses humor when fighting. She has stated that she does not want to kill her foes, especially ones which she has already subdued.

She has also started and led her own disaster relief organization, and felt great remorse for almost destroying a small town (due to her transformed state briefly turning uncontrollable from radiation), whereupon she helped construction workers to rebuild it.

As a highly idealistic lawyer, the character has a history of defending the rights of minorities, the mentally ill, civil liberties, including the right for criminals to not be unduly mistreated and get a proper defense, or individuals to not be victimized by certain less ethical corporations, but also a belief in the necessity of law and order. These priorities have sometimes made her personally conflicted, such as reversing her stance regarding the Superhuman Registration Act; and being disillusioned when her more famous cousin (whom she considers as a brother) was shot into space without due process, or when what she thought to be a torturer and murderer of children was cleared from all charges.

In an interview, former She-Hulk writer Peter David describes her as follows:

Unlike Hulk, Jennifer's personality and intelligence are less affected when she transforms into She-Hulk, although she becomes more self-confident and assertive. In court it was proven that her mutated form also has fewer inhibitions, as proven during a trial for the Leader; for example, while Jennifer Walters has only had a few sexual partners, reading back a list of She-Hulk's conquests took considerable time. For a long time, She-Hulk could not revert to her original human form, but that turned out to be psychosomatic due to her not actually wanting to.

Breaking the fourth wall

For a time, starting with the Sensational She-Hulk series by John Byrne in 1989, She-Hulk was portrayed with a form of "cross-dimensional" or metafictional awareness to break the fourth wall. In some stories, she showed an awareness of being a comic book character, with visuals of her "tearing the page" or "walking through a page of advertisements" to reach an enemy's control center. She sometimes engaged in arguments with the writer (John Byrne), or appealed to the comic's editor, Renée Witterstaetter. The Sensational She-Hulk #50 (Byrne's last issue) involved Renée locking a bound-and-gagged Byrne in a storage closet while she and Jen tried to find the book's new writer. This trend was briefly carried on during her tenure with the Heroes for Hire, when she "spoke" to the book's narrator and "fired" him for losing the plot. Other Marvel characters that have been written to directly "address" the audience include She-Hulk's friend Louise Mason, Uatu the Watcher (who narrates a majority of the issues of What If by speaking directly to the reader), and Deadpool. On occasion, this practice has also been used for Loki, Rick Jones, Wyatt Wingfoot, and Howard the Duck. The latest series has not acknowledged this primarily-humor-based quirk of She-Hulk's, save for a coda in vol. 2 #3 (#100), in which Stu Cicero, a law firm "researcher" asks Jen if she can "really do stuff like that." She somewhat wistfully replies "No. I can't" – however, the panel is drawn at a somewhat ambiguous angle that suggests She-Hulk may be looking "out" of the comic at the reader. She-Hulk's most recent profile in the Official Handbook of the Marvel Universe continues to list this "ability" of hers, and confirms that she is simply downplaying it for the benefit of those around her.

The Dan Slott series took a different approach to the metafiction angle, making use of a concept dating back to Lee and Kirby's early Fantastic Four – that the heroes of the Marvel Universe permit licensed comic-book adaptations of their adventures to be published. Since all comics published before 2001 bear the seal of the Comics Code Authority of America (a federal agency in the Marvel Universe), they are considered legal documents admissible as evidence in the superhuman law cases on which She-Hulk works.

If She-Hulk defeats Deadpool as the final opponent in Marvel vs. Capcom 3: Fate of Two Worlds, she will say "You know, if this game were made in 1991, I'd be the one whacking YOU with a health bar." This references Deadpool's fourth wall-breaking hyper move, where he attacks the opponent with his own life bar, as well as the character's rise in popularity in recent years. In the game's update Ultimate Marvel vs. Capcom 3, if Deadpool is her first opponent, before the match starts she will claim that she can break the fourth wall as well. If she defeats him as her last opponent, She-Hulk will threaten to beat him in Marvel vs. Capcom 4 if the game is ever made.

Relationships
She-Hulk's relationships with men have been defined by her dual needs for independence and acceptance. These needs were evident in her often-tempestuous relationship with her father, Sheriff Morris Walters. A widower whose wife had been killed by mobsters, Walters was overprotective, controlling, and judgmental. In response, Jennifer sought independence from her father, while also desiring his acceptance.

Sheriff Walters felt that the best way for Jennifer to live was for her to follow his values. However, Jennifer grew up perceiving the gray areas of law enforcement (for example, she interpreted the events leading up to riots which occurred during her childhood differently from her father). Although Jennifer saw her decision to become a criminal defense attorney as a kind of homage to her father, Sheriff Walters instead interpreted her choice (to defend criminals) as a rejection of his values.

Jennifer worked at nurturing a supportive relationship with her father, and remained close to a childhood friend, Zapper, with whom she ultimately became romantically involved. Being She-Hulk allowed Jennifer to express emotions which she was not otherwise comfortable revealing. For example, although Jennifer Walters was restrained from dating a younger man, as She-Hulk she felt free to express her affection for Zapper. During that same time, Jennifer pursued a problematic relationship with the affable ne'er-do-well Richard Rory (a supporting character created by Steve Gerber for the Man-Thing stories), who actually valued her for who she really was.

Ultimately, She-Hulk's relationship with Zapper fell apart, primarily due to her insistence on permanently remaining in her She-Hulk form, eschewing the Jennifer Walters persona that Zapper had grown up with. Zapper believed that Jennifer's preference represented a rejection of the character's true self. Although in actuality She-Hulk liberated much of Jennifer Walters' repressed personality, the She-Hulk persona also repressed certain aspects of Jennifer Walters' personality which She-Hulk found distasteful.

During her time as an Avenger, She-Hulk engaged in a relationship with Starfox. However, this encounter was later retold in flashback, and in that storyline, Starfox was on trial, charged with sexually assaulting a married woman. The alleged victim testified that Starfox's euphoria power had forced her to be sexually forward, similarly to She-Hulk's own encounter with Starfox. Jennifer assumed that her interaction with Starfox had not been consensual after hearing this testimony, but she later discovered that he had not used his powers on her.

It was also during her Avengers tenure that she met and became fast friends with her teammate Janet van Dyne, who would become a huge influence on She-Hulk's personal development by encouraging her to adopt a more free-going lifestyle, and even help her in times of need. When the Wasp was temporarily killed by the Wrecking Crew during the first Secret War, She-Hulk impulsively stormed off to avenge her, only to nearly fall victim herself to the Wrecking Crew, the Absorbing Man, Titania and Doctor Octopus.

She-Hulk was briefly engaged to the younger Wyatt Wingfoot, whom she first met during her tenure with the Fantastic Four. She let her guard down with Wyatt, expressing her vulnerabilities as Wyatt supported her during a series of traumatic events. A paparazzo took photos of her sunbathing topless (but nobody ultimately knew it was She-Hulk due to an unwitting editor 'correcting' her green skin). Later, corrupt agents of S.H.I.E.L.D. forced her to strip naked and be medically examined as a "potential threat like her cousin". This was all filmed for personal arousal purposes, before Dum Dum Dugan put a stop to the harassment. Although She-Hulk put forward a brave exterior during those incidents, she was actually quite shaken and appreciated Wyatt's support.

Although She-Hulk deeply values close emotional ties with family, friends, and lovers, she seldom admits the depth of her need for these attachments. For example, years after her mother died, Jennifer could not move on from the family home. Even when her father moved out, Jennifer would not leave her family memories behind. The Avengers and Fantastic Four became surrogate families for her; she forged strong bonds with them.

She-Hulk was married to John Jameson, whom she first met while he was the Man-Wolf in a Microverse adventure in The Savage She-Hulk. The two precipitously eloped in Las Vegas. The two shared an apartment with She-Hulk's colleague, Augustus "Pug" Pugliese, who holds an unspoken (but obvious) crush on her. Pug correctly deduced that both the suddenness of She-Hulk's strengthened feelings for Jameson, as well as the pair's marriage, were the result of manipulation by Starfox. Due to his efforts to prove this, She-Hulk and John became aware of Pug's crush just as John was forced to become the Man-Wolf once more.

She-Hulk's passion for John has cooled since Starfox's "love zap" was removed. However, John was never zapped, and his deep love for Jennifer Walters has been confirmed (John has stated a preference for She-Hulk in her human form). She-Hulk's reaction to John as the Man-Wolf/the Stargod has not been positive. The marriage has been annulled.

She-Hulk had a date with Power Man while both were on the Heroes for Hire team. She resisted dating an "ex-con", but after a scuffle with Titania and the Absorbing Man where Cage aided her, she reconsidered. The relationship never developed, but a friendship between them was formed.

After Jennifer broke up with John Jameson (but before he signed the annulment) she had flings with Clay Quartermain and Tony Stark, and even made a pass at Wolverine. Wolverine rebuffs her, saying he has no wish to "chase after Juggernaut's sloppy seconds." She-Hulk repeatedly vehemently denies sleeping with the Juggernaut (as a wanted criminal who has attempted to murder her cousin), despite the two previously being shown in bed together. It is revealed that the Juggernaut had, in fact, bedded a She-Hulk from an alternate universe. An out of continuity tongue-in-cheek mini-chapter later spoofs this, by jokingly showing the two characters as passionately in love.

Perhaps her longest crush is on Hercules, about whom she has repeatedly dreamt. However, after fighting demons together, she rebuffs Hercules' advances, seeing him as a muscle-bound oaf. After Hercules jovially smacks her bottom, She-Hulk sends him through a brick wall, and says she will relegate the idea of a relationship with him to fantasy, as she finds the reality disappointing. Despite this, years afterwards they eventually sleep together.

She-Hulk has many friends in the superhuman community, most of whom showed up for her Christmas party in the 2015 Gwenpool Special.

Costumes
Due to her affiliation with different supergroups over the years, She-Hulk has donned numerous costumes. She-Hulk's personality has also gone through significant changes: from aggressive and short-tempered to intelligent, free-spirited, and vivacious.

Because of her various outfit changes, no single costume can be considered iconic (compared to Superman's blue and red tights, or Spider-Man's red and blue costume and mask). However, She-Hulk is immediately recognizable due to her size, green skin, and long, dark green, almost black hair.

In her first appearance, She-Hulk was a massive, towering figure, with wild, untamed, waist-length hair. She wore a ragged white dress or blouse (the dress ripping and tearing as Walters turned into her giant alter ego). That white garment, which was often only the blouse that Walters had on before her transformation, always covered her upper body and midsection (in the same way that enough of the Hulk's pants survived to cover him after his transformations). When she was asked about this in an early issue of the second series, Jennifer responded that her clothes carry the label of the Comics Code.

After her Savage era, She-Hulk wore appropriately sized clothes. For instance, she joined the Avengers and began dressing in a one-piece aerobics outfit. During the Avengers era, she wore a purple, one-piece swimsuit with a white belt and boots.

After the first of the Secret Wars, She-Hulk took the place of the Thing and became a full-fledged member of the Fantastic Four. Her costume kept the sleeveless/legless leotard design, incorporating the colors and style of the team's costumes, with a "4" prominently displayed across her chest and white gloves and boots. After leaving the Fantastic Four, she rejoined the Avengers, donning a white one-piece costume with the blue Avengers insignia emblazoned on it.

She-Hulk has then worn a purple and white one-piece leotard, complemented by fingerless gloves and sneakers. Her hair is long and straight, as opposed to the thick, curly tresses she sported in the past. After the events of World War Hulk, she has added baggy low-rise jeans to this look.

Cultural impact and legacy

Critical reception 
Jenna Anderson of Comicbook.com stated, "Although she has had a slew of different comic interpretations over the years, John Byrne's take on her in The Sensational She-Hulk is often regarded as the most iconic – both for further developing her as a character, and for satirizing the comic book tropes of the time. In the decades since, She-Hulk has consistently remained spirited and feisty, but also incredibly intelligent, empathetic, and altruistic, both in her life as a superhero and as a lawyer." Chris Arrant of Newsarama said, "From the novel idea of a lawyer specializing in superhero law to a successful businesswoman dealing with the realities (and fiction) of controlling (or not controlling) her anger issues, She-Hulk isn't a cliché or an archetype, which makes her one of top characters in the Marvel U. IGN wrote, "Plenty of heroes have gained female sidekicks over the years, but few of these ladies have so capably managed to escape the shadow of their namesakes as She-Hulk. Where Hulk is merely an outlet for Bruce Banner's rage and pain, She-Hulk is pure liberation for the geeky, mousy Jennifer Walters. This gamma gal has an impressive track record in comics, and we're waiting for her to join her cousin on the big screen."

UGO Team of UGO Networks described She-Hulk one of the "best heroes of all time," writing, "There's nothing that's a cheap cross-marketing ploy about She-hulk [...] If nothing else, she has proven to have a longer shelf life than Spider-Woman (who is also in no way a cheap marketing ploy)." Alyssa Rosenberg of The Washington Post called She-Hulk a feminist superhero, writing, "From the very start, She-Hulk was recognizable as a manifestation of a particularly female dilemma that persists today. She is an expression of how terrific it would be not to have to censor yourself, to be allowed to be angry without some man declaring you unladylike. [...] She-Hulk is not a male fantasy of how sexual liberation works, where women focus more on making men happy than on their own pleasure. Rather, she is an adventuress with a clear sense of her own gratification and joy." Peyton Hinckle of ComicsVerse referred to She-Hulk as a female role model, saying, "As a strong, self-confident woman who completely ignores female stereotypes, she's the kind of character more people — especially younger readers — need to see. She happily accepts the things that make her different and she doesn't try to hide herself just because others disapprove. She struggles with things too, but at the end of the day, she proves that with the right thinking, anything is possible. For male and female comic readers alike, that's an important message."

Accolades 

 In 2011, Wizard ranked She-Hulk 104th in their "200 comic book characters" list.
 In 2011, Comics Buyer's Guide ranked She-Hulk 11th in their "100 Sexiest Women in Comics" list.
 In 2011, IGN ranked She-Hulk 88th in their "100 comic book heroes" list.
 In 2011, UGO Networks included She-Hulk in their "Best Heroes of All Time" list.
 In 2015, Gizmodo ranked She-Hulk 16th in their "Every Member Of The Avengers" list.
 In 2015, Entertainment Weekly ranked She-Hulk 19th in their "Let's rank every Avenger ever" list.
 In 2015, IGN ranked She-Hulk 18th inn their "Top 50 Avengers" list.
 In 2016, CBR.com ranked She-Hulk 18th in their "Top 100 Marvel Characters" list.
 In 2016, Screen Rant ranked She-Hulk 13th in their "20 Most Powerful Members Of The Avengers" list.
 In 2018, CBR.com ranked She-Hulk 19th in their "25 Most Powerful Avengers" list.
 In 2018, The Mary Sue ranked She-Hulk 1st in their "7 Female Superheroes Who Should Join Marvel’s Cinematic Universe" list.
 In 2019, Daily Mirror ranked She-Hulk 8th in their "Best female superheroes of all time" list.
 In 2019, CBR.com ranked She-Hulk 5th in their "A-Force: 10 Most Powerful Members Of The All-Female Avengers Team" list.
 In 2020, Scary Mommy included She-Hulk in their "Looking For A Role Model? These 195+ Marvel Female Characters Are Truly Heroic" list.
 In 2021, Looper ranked She-Hulk 10th in their "Strongest Superheroes In History" list.
 In 2021, CBR.com ranked She-Hulk 1st in their "Marvel: The 10 Strongest Female Heroes" list, 3rd in their "20 Strongest Female Superheroes" list, and 7th in their "20 Most Powerful Female Members Of The Avengers" list.
 In 2022, Newsarama ranked She-Hulk 8th in their "Best Marvel characters of all time" list.
 In 2022, Screen Rant ranked She-Hulk 3rd in their "10 Most Powerful Members Of The Lady Liberators" list.
 In 2022, CBR.com ranked She-Hulk 2nd in their "10 Most Powerful Lawyers In Marvel Comics" list, 5th in their "10 Most Powerful Members Of The Fantastic Four" list, 8th in their "10 Most Attractive Marvel Heroes" list, and 9th in their "10 Scariest Avengers" list.
 In 2022, Screen Rant included She-Hulk in their "10 Most Powerful Lawyers In Comics" list.
 In 2023, CBR.com ranked She-Hulk 10th in their "10 Most Fashionable Marvel Heroes" list.

Literary reception

Volumes

She-Hulk – 2014 
According to Diamond Comic Distributors, She-Hulk #1 was the 36th best selling comic book in February 2014.

Kelly Thompson of CBR.com called She-Hulk #1 a "strong opening for a character well deserving of the spotlight," asserting, "Overall, "She-Hulk #1 is a great start to a new series for a character well deserving of the spotlight. If Soule can find a way to better balance the lawyer element of the book by sprinkling in a bit more action, he and Pulido are likely to have a hit on their hands." Benjamin Bailey of IGN gave She-Hulk #1 a grade of 9.8 out of 10, writing, "This is not a superhero book. Not even a little bit. It's more Hawkeye than Hulk, following the stories of Jennifer Walters's law career – or lack of career, as the book starts – and what she does when she's not an Avenger or member of the FF. In other words, this is a comic that could have gone really bad really fast. In the wrong hands, this thing could have been a boring, bizarre mess. Fortunately, due to the very capable Charles Soule and Javier Pulido, that is not the case. In fact, She-Hulk #1 is absolutely fantastic. It's the She-Hulk comic we never knew we needed."

She-Hulk  (Marvel Legacy) –  2017 
According to Diamond Comic Distributors, She-Hulk #159 was the 48th best selling comic book in November 2017.

Joshua Davison of Bleeding Cool stated, "She-Hulk #159 was a pleasantly surprising read. The story was gripping, if a bit slow. We don't get to see Jen fully She-Hulk out, but she is a likable enough character that I was fine just reading about her. Hellcat has a great presence in the comic too, and the read was overall compelling. I recommend it. Check it out." Joe Garza of SlashFilm included She-Hulk #159 in their "15 Best She-Hulk Comics You Need To Read" list, asserting, "The Leader has always been a great villain for the Hulk — and this storyline proves that he's just as great against She-Hulk — as he's typically forced into using his immense intellect to best a foe who relies on brute force. However, this story shines as an exploration of PTSD. During this time in the Marvel Comics universe, Bruce Banner was dead (only to return, of course), and the heroes had been rocked by a lasting status quo shakeup, She-Hulk included. This storyline saw her dealing with loss and identity in a way rarely seen before in "She-Hulk" comics, and it's handled with all of the grace (and punching) it deserves."

Immortal She-Hulk – 2020 
According to Diamond Comic Distributors, Immortal She-Hulk #1 was the 17th best selling comic book in September 2020.

Oscar Maltby of Newsarama described Immortal She-Hulk #1 as an "emotionally weighty one-shot," stating, "Immortal She-Hulk #1 is a tie-in trapped between two worlds. Directly picking up in the fallout of Empyre but with roots much deeper than that summer event, Ewing and Davis-Hunt offer up an accomplished one-shot that is one third a retrospective, one third a philosophical piece on the nature of immortality, and one third a short but potent chapter in Ewing's Immortal Hulk saga." Sam Stone of CBR.com said, "The Immortal She-Hulk #1 provides a welcome window into Jennifer Walters' psyche as she grapples her own mortality and place in the Marvel Universe. While positioning She-Hulk for a bigger role in the main Immortal Hulk series and its escalating battle against the story's true, sinister mastermind the issue provides a nice change of pace by leaning more into introspection and character study than entirely focusing on smashing – though there is smashing to be had! For She-Hulk fans that have been looking for a less savage iteration of the character, this special one-shot issue provides them the chance to see both sides of Jennifer Walters in full." Connor Casey of Comicbook.com gave Immortal She-Hulk #1 a grade of 4 out of 5, asserting, "Al Ewing brings the brilliance from his Immortal Hulk run to this Immortal She-Hulk one-shot, in which Jennifer Walters explores some of the biggest ideas that haunt comic characters from the margins. What does it mean to come back from the dead? Is immortality real or is it merely a longer life span. What happens when somebody who is immortal suddenly… isn't? Ewing doesn't answer every question here (how could he possibly?) but it's fascinating to see characters like She-Hulk, Wolverine and Thor discuss these concepts."

She-Hulk – 2022 
According to Diamond Comic Distributors, She-Hulk #1 was the 9th best selling comic book in January 2022.

Sayantan Gayen of CBR.com described She-Hulk #1 as "lighthearted story," saying, "She-Hulk #1 provides a rare insight into the busy civilian life of Jennifer Walters. Much of the positive tone of the issue exudes from its lead, but there is also a sense of anxiousness as Walters interacts with a new environment – a point well made by Rowell throughout the book. While the story does not have an antagonist yet, there is no sluggishness in the narrative's pace. The story's plot matches the speed of Jennifer's hectic schedule. Whatever serenity Jen finds in this story quickly ends when a long-forgotten Marvel character crashes through her door, ending She-Hulk #1 on a shocking and rewarding cliffhanger." Joe Garza of SlashFilm included She-Hulk #1 in their "15 Best She-Hulk Comics You Need To Read" list, stating, "This new solo series is the perfect jumping-on point for casual fans, as it establishes a whole new status quo for She-Hulk, setting the stage for adventures that aren't beholden to past continuity. However, there are still plenty of nods to She-Hulk's long history to keep legacy fans happy as well. It's a back-to-basics comic that strips the character down to what made her so special in her formative years."

Other versions

Earth-Charnel
She-Hulk is seen as one of the last few Avengers fighting the entity called Charnel. It had been tormenting her 2020 Earth for decades; she had spent two of those years partnered with the Rhino. She is killed in action during the defeat of Charnel.

Earth X
In the Earth X series, Jennifer Walters is killed while being possessed by the Hydra; the resultant being becomes a Hydra Queen.

Future Imperfect
In Maestro's alternate future aka Future Imperfect, Jennifer is called Shulk and her partner is Emil; the two combine forces to fight Maestro, but are continuously defeated.

Marvel Her-oes
A teenaged version of She-Hulk appears as one of the main protagonists of Marvel Her-oes, an all-ages series written by Grace Randolph. In this continuity, she is the best friend of Janet van Dyne, and is unaware that she possesses superpowers.

Marvel Zombies
In the Marvel Zombies universe, She-Hulk is seen exiting Avengers Mansion already zombified. She is later seen being restrained by the Thing after eating Franklin and Valeria Richards. The Invisible Woman then proceeds to create a force field inside She-Hulk's head, effectively killing her and also obliterating her zombified body.

Ultimate Marvel
In Ultimate Marvel, Jen Walters is introduced in Ultimate Wolverine vs Hulk after being mentioned by her cousin Bruce in Ultimates 2. Dr. Walters works for S.H.I.E.L.D. performing Super-Soldier research and development in the vein of her cousin, resulting in a Hulk like transformation without the rage.

Betty Ross would later become She-Hulk in the same series, she is later contained by S.H.I.E.L.D. after stealing a vial of the serum.

Old Man Logan
In the "Old Man Logan" reality, She-Hulk and a gamma-overloaded Hulk had an incestuous relationship and gave birth to a "hillbilly" clan of super-strong but dimwitted Hulks called the Hulk Gang.

In the pages of the "Old Man Logan" comics, it was revealed that She-Hulk assisted Daredevil and the Moon Knight in fighting the Enchantress and Electro in Manhattan. The part with Hulk impregnating her remains intact sometime after that fight.

Spider-Gwen
In the Spider-Gwen continuity, She-Hulk is a famous wrestler who came to Gwen's high school and challenged audience members to a wrestling match similar to Crusher Hogan of the main continuity. Unlike Crusher, she offered to donate the money to charity if she lost. Gwen was prepared to fight She-Hulk in her first week as Spider-Woman, but got distracted when a robber threatened Ben Parker. While Ben and Gwen dealt with the robber, She-Hulk lets the Mary Janes defeat her so she could donate to the charity.

In other media

Television
 She-Hulk appears in The Incredible Hulk (1982), voiced by Victoria Carroll.
 She-Hulk was intended to appear in the made-for-television film The Death of the Incredible Hulk, but did not make the final cut. A year later, a proposed She-Hulk series for the ABC network was considered "dead".
 She-Hulk makes a cameo appearance in the Fantastic Four (1994) episodes "To Battle the Living Planet" and "Doomsday".
 She-Hulk appears in The Incredible Hulk (1996), voiced by Lisa Zane in the first season and Cree Summer in the second season. She initially appears as a guest character before becoming a main character, which led to the series being renamed The Incredible Hulk and She-Hulk. In the second season, She-Hulk is shown to enjoy an active sport-filled life to show off her strength and agility and will revert to her human form if she pushes herself too far for extended periods of time, with an adrenaline rush allowing her to change back.
 She-Hulk appears in the Fantastic Four: World's Greatest Heroes episode "The Cure", voiced by Rebecca Shoichet. After Ben Grimm is reverted to his human form, She-Hulk auditions to replace him in the Fantastic Four and maintains the position until Grimm changes back.
 She-Hulk appears in The Super Hero Squad Show episode "So Pretty When They Explode!", voiced by Katee Sackhoff.
 She-Hulk appears in Hulk and the Agents of S.M.A.S.H., voiced by Eliza Dushku. This version is a stunt pilot and a member of the titular team.
 She-Hulk appears in the Ultimate Spider-Man four-part episode "Contest of Champions," voiced again by Eliza Dushku.

Film
After two television projects for She-Hulk failed to materialize, a live-action motion picture was planned in the early 1990s, with Larry Cohen as writer and director. Ten months later, Brigitte Nielsen was announced to play the title role. She posed for photos dressed both as She-Hulk and her alter ego Jennifer Walters, but the movie was never completed.

Marvel Cinematic Universe

 In November 2019, Marvel Studios president Kevin Feige said that there are plans to feature She-Hulk in future Marvel Cinematic Universe (MCU) films following her introduction in her television series (see below).
 Tatiana Maslany portrays Jennifer Walters in the MCU / Disney+ series She-Hulk: Attorney at Law. This version is accidentally cross-contaminated with Bruce Banner's blood following an attack by a Sakaaran scout ship instead of intentionally getting a blood transfusion from him.

Video games
 She-Hulk appears as a playable character in Fantastic Four (1997).
 Evil doppelgangers of She-Hulk appear in Marvel Super Heroes: War of the Gems.
 She-Hulk appears in Marvel Ultimate Alliance 2, voiced by Alicia Coppola. She appears as a mini-boss in the Anti-Registration campaign and a playable character in the Nintendo DS version.
 She-Hulk appears as a playable character in Marvel Super Hero Squad: The Infinity Gauntlet, voiced again by Cree Summer.
 She-Hulk appears as a playable character in Marvel vs. Capcom 3: Fate of Two Worlds and Ultimate Marvel vs. Capcom 3, voiced by Maria Canals-Barrera.
 She-Hulk appeared as an unlockable playable character in Marvel Super Hero Squad Online, voiced by Grey DeLisle.
 She-Hulk appeared as an unlockable playable character in Marvel Avengers Alliance. She-Hulk later becomes one of the Serpent's Worthy, Skirn.
 She-Hulk appeared as a non-playable and playable character in Marvel Heroes via the "Advance Pack 2" DLC, voiced by Mary Faber.
 She-Hulk appears as an unlockable playable character in Lego Marvel Super Heroes, voiced by Tara Strong.
 She-Hulk appears in Marvel Pinball as part of the "Infinity Gauntlet", "Civil War", and "Women of Power" tables.
 She-Hulk appears as an unlockable playable character in Marvel Avengers Alliance Tactics.
 She-Hulk appears as a playable character in Marvel: Avengers Alliance 2.
 She-Hulk appears as an unlockable playable character in Lego Marvel's Avengers, voiced by Misty Lee.
 She-Hulk appears as an unlockable playable character in Marvel Future Fight.
 She-Hulk appears as an unlockable playable character in Marvel Contest of Champions.
 She-Hulk appeared as an unlockable playable character in Marvel Avengers Academy.
 She-Hulk appears as an unlockable playable character in Lego Marvel Super Heroes 2, voiced by Melli Bond.
 She-Hulk appears as an unlockable playable character in Marvel Puzzle Quest.
 She-Hulk appears as a purchasable outfit in Fortnite Battle Royale.
 She-Hulk appears in Marvel Snap.

Miscellaneous
Jennifer Walters appears in the motion comic Marvel Knights: Ultimate Wolverine vs. Hulk, voiced by Nicole Oliver.

Collected editions

The Savage She-Hulk

The Sensational She-Hulk

She-Hulk

She-Hulks

One-Shots

References

External links

 She-Hulk at Marvel.com

1979 comics debuts
Avengers (comics) characters
Characters created by Stan Lee
Comics about women
Comics characters introduced in 1979
Comics spin-offs
Feminist comics
Fictional American lawyers
Fictional characters from Los Angeles
Fictional characters who break the fourth wall
Fictional characters with nuclear or radiation abilities
Fictional characters with slowed ageing
Fictional characters with spirit possession or body swapping abilities
Fictional characters with superhuman durability or invulnerability
Fictional criminologists
Fictional defense attorneys
Fictional female lawyers
Fictional feminists and women's rights activists
Fictional illeists
Fictional women soldiers and warriors
Hulk (comics)
Marvel Comics American superheroes
Marvel Comics characters who are shapeshifters
Marvel Comics characters who can move at superhuman speeds
Marvel Comics characters with accelerated healing
Marvel Comics characters with superhuman strength
Marvel Comics female superheroes
Marvel Comics martial artists
Marvel Comics mutates
Marvel Comics titles
S.H.I.E.L.D. agents